Culrain railway station serves the village of Culrain in  Kyle of Sutherland in the Highland council area of Scotland. It is located on the Far North Line. ScotRail, who manage the station, operate all services.

History 
The station opened in 1871, as part of the Sutherland Railway, later becoming part of the Highland Railway and later the London, Midland and Scottish Railway.

The original nameboard is now preserved at the Bredgar and Wormshill Light Railway, in Kent (see left).

Location 
The station is close to Carbisdale Castle, which operated from 1945 to 2011 as a youth hostel owned by the Scottish Youth Hostels Association.  The hostel has been closed since 2011 as a result of structural damage. Following its sale to a consortium in 2016,  planning permission was granted in 2017/2018 to turn the castle back into a private residence but now with swimming pool.

Facilities 
The station has a waiting shelter, a bench, a help point and cycle racks, and has step-free access. As there are no facilities to purchase tickets, passengers must buy one in advance, or from the guard on the train.

Previously, passengers wishing to board a train at Scotscalder had to flag the train by raising their arm (as is still done at other request stops around the country); this meant that the driver needed to reduce the train's speed before a request stop (to look out for any potential passengers on the platform and be able to stop if necessary), even if the platform was empty. The new system consists of an automatic kiosk (with a button for passengers to press) at the platform; this will alert the driver about any waiting passengers in advance and, if there is no requirement to stop, the train can maintain line speed through the request stops, thus improving reliability on the whole line.

Platform layout 
The station has a single platform which is long enough for a five-coach train.

Passenger volume 
In the last few years, Culrain has generally seen falling passenger numbers, as shown below.

The statistics cover twelve month periods that start in April.

Services 
On Sundays, there is one train in each direction.

This station is designated as a request stop since 2013. This means that passengers intending to alight must inform the guard in advance, and any passengers wishing to board must press a "request" button located at the kiosk on the platform.

References

Bibliography

External links
 

Railway stations in Sutherland
Railway stations served by ScotRail
Railway stations in Great Britain opened in 1871
Former Highland Railway stations
Railway request stops in Great Britain